Foster care is a system in which a minor has been placed into a ward, group home (residential child care community, treatment center, etc.), or private home of a state-certified caregiver, referred to as a "foster parent", or with a family member approved by the state. The placement of the child is normally arranged through the government or a social service agency. The institution, group home, or foster parent is compensated for expenses unless with a family member. In some states, relative or "Kinship" caregivers of children who are wards of the state are provided with a financial stipend.

The state, via the family court and child protective services agency, stand in loco parentis to the minor, making all legal decisions while the foster parent is responsible for the day-to-day care of the minor.

Scholars and activists are concerned about the efficacy of the foster care services provided by NGOs. Specifically, this pertains to poor retention rates of social workers. Poor retention rates are attributed to being overworked in an emotionally draining field that offers minimal monetary compensation. The lack of professionals pursuing a degree in social work coupled with poor retention rates in the field has led to a shortage of social workers and created large caseloads for those who choose to work and stay in the field.  The efficacy of caseworker retention also affects the overall ability to care for clients. Low staffing leads to data limitations that infringe on caseworkers' ability to adequately serve clients and their families. 

Foster care is correlated with a range of negative outcomes compared to the general population. Children in foster care have a high rate of ill health, particularly psychiatric conditions such as anxiety, depression, and eating disorders. One third of foster children in a US study reported abuse from a foster parent or other adult in the foster home. Nearly half of foster children in the US become homeless when they reach the age of 18, and the poverty rate is three times higher among foster care alumni than in the general population.

By country

Australia

In Australia foster care was known as "boarding-out". Foster care had its early stages in South Australia in 1867 and stretched to the second half of the 19th century. It is said that the system was mostly run by women until the early 20th century. Then the control was centered in many state children's departments. "Although boarding-out was also implemented by non-government[al] child rescue organizations, many large institutions remained. These institutions assumed an increasing importance from the late 1920s when the system went into decline." The system was re-energized in the postwar era, and in the 1970s. The system is still the main structure for "out-of-home care". The system took care of both local and foreign children. "The first adoption legislation was passed in Western Australia in 1896, but the remaining states did not act until the 1920s, introducing the beginnings of the closed adoption that reached it peak in the period 1940–1975. New baby adoption dropped dramatically from the mid-1970s, with the greater tolerance of and support for single mothers".

Cambodia
Foster care in Cambodia is relatively new as an official practice within the government. However, despite a later start, the practice is currently making great strides within the country. Left with a large number of official and unofficial orphanages from the 1990s, the Cambodian government conducted several research projects in 2006 and 2008, pointing to the overuse of orphanages as a solution for caring for vulnerable children within the country. Most notably, the studies found that the percentage of children within orphanages that had parents approached 80%. At the same time, local NGOs like "Children In Families" began offering limited foster care services within the country. In the subsequent years, the Cambodian government began implementing policies that required the closure of some orphanages and the implementation of minimum standards for residential care institutions. These actions lead to an increase in the number of NGOs providing foster care placements and helped to set the course for care reform around the country. As of 2015, the Cambodian government is working with UNICEF, USAID, several governments, and many local NGOs in continuing to build the capacity for child protection and foster care within the Kingdom.

Canada

Foster children in Canada are known as permanent wards (crown wards in Ontario). A ward is someone, in this case a child, placed under protection of a legal guardian and are the legal responsibility of the government. Census data from 2011 counted children in foster care for the first time, counting 47,885 children in care. The majority of foster children – 29,590, or about 62 per cent – were aged 14 and under. The wards remain under the care of the government until they "age out of care". All ties are severed from the government and there is no longer any legal responsibility toward the youth. This age is different depending on the province.

Israel

In December 2013, the Israeli Knesset approved a bill co-drafted by the Israel National Council for the Child to regulate the rights and obligations of participants in the foster care system in Israel.

Japan
The idea of foster care or taking in abandoned children actually came about around 1392–1490s in Japan. The foster care system in Japan is similar to the Orphan Trains because Brace thought the children would be better off on farms. The people in Japan thought the children would do better on farms rather than living in the "dusty city". The families would often send their children to a farm family outside the village and only keep their oldest son. The farm families served as the foster parents and they were financially rewarded for taking in the younger siblings. "It was considered an honor to be chosen as foster parents, and selection greatly depended on the family's reputation and status within the village". Around 1895 the foster care program became more like the system used in the United States because the Tokyo Metropolitan Police sent children to a hospital where they would be "settled". Problems emerged in this system, such as child abuse, so the government started phasing it out and "began increasing institutional facilities". In 1948 the Child Welfare Law was passed, increasing official oversight, and creating better conditions for the children to grow up in.

United Kingdom

In the United Kingdom, foster care and adoption has always been an option, "in the sense of taking other people's children into their homes and looking after them on a permanent or temporary basis." Although, nothing about it had a legal foundation, until the 20th century. The UK had "wardship", the family taking in the child had custody by the Chancery Court. Wardship was not used very often because it did not give the guardian "parental rights". In the 19th century came a "series of baby farming scandals". At the end of the 19th century they started calling it "boarding-out" like they did in Australia. They started placing the children in orphanages and workhouses as well. "The First World War saw an increase in organized adoption through adoption societies and child rescue organizations, and pressure grew for adoption to be given legal status." The first laws based on adoption and foster care were passed in 1926. "The peak number of adoptions was in 1968, since then there has been an enormous decline in adoption in the United Kingdom. The main reasons for children being adopted in the United Kingdom had been unmarried mothers giving up their children for adoption and stepparents adopting their new partner's children".

United States

In the United States, foster care started as a result of the efforts of Charles Loring Brace. "In the mid 19th Century, some 30,000 homeless or neglected children lived in the New York City streets and slums." Brace took these children off the streets and placed them with families in most states in the country. Brace believed the children would do best with a Christian farm family. He did this to save them from "a lifetime of suffering" He sent these children to families by train, which gave the name The Orphan Train Movement. "This lasted from 1853 to the early 1890s and transported more than 120,000 250,000? children to new lives." When Brace died in 1890, his sons took over his work of the Children's Aid Society until they retired. The Children's Aid Society created "a foster care approach that became the basis for the federal Adoption and Safe Families Act of 1997" called Concurrent Planning. This greatly impacted the foster care system.

From August 1999 to August 2019, 9,073,607 American children have been removed from their families and placed in foster homes according to the federal government Adoption and Foster Care Analysis and Reporting System.

As last reported in August 2019, 437,238 children nationally were removed from their families and placed in foster homes according to the federal government Adoption and Foster Care Analysis and Reporting System.

- 24% of foster children are between the ages of 0 and 2

- 18% of foster children are between the ages of 3 and 5

- 28% of foster children are between the ages of 6 and 12

- 40% of foster children are between the ages of 13 and 21

- Average # of birthdays a child spends in foster care: 2 

- 22% of children had three or more placements during a length of 20 months in foster care.

- 91% of foster children under the age of 2 are adopted.

France
In France, foster families are called  (literally "welcome families"). Foster homes must obtain an official approval from the government in order to welcome a minor or an elderly person. In order to receive this approval they must follow a training and their home is inspected to be sure it is safe and healthy. In 2017, 344 000 minors and 15000 elderly persons were welcomed in foster homes.

Placement 

Family-based foster care is generally preferred to other forms of out of home care. Foster care is intended to be a short-term solution until a permanent placement can be made. In most states, the primary objective is to reconcile children with the biological parents. However, if the parents are unable or unwilling to care for the child, or if the child is an orphan, then the first choice of adoptive parents is a relative such as an aunt, uncle or grandparent, known as kinship care. Most kinship care is done informally, without the involvement of a court or public organization. However, in the United States, formal kinship care is increasingly common. In 2012, a quarter of all children in formal foster care were placed with relatives instead of being placed into the system.

If no related family member is willing or able to adopt, the next preference is for the child to be adopted by the foster parents or by someone else involved in the child's life (such as a teacher or coach). This is to maintain continuity in the child's life. If neither above option are available, the child may be adopted by someone who is a stranger to the child.

If none of these options are viable, the plan for the minor may be to enter OPPLA (Other Planned Permanent Living Arrangement). This option allows the child to stay in custody of the state and the child can stay placed in a foster home, with a relative or a long-term care facility, such as a residential child care community or, for children with development disabilities, physical disabilities or mental disabilities, a treatment center.

671,000 children were served by the foster care system in the United States in 2015. "After declining more than 20 percent between FY 2006 and FY 2012 to a low of 397,000, the number of children in foster care on the last day of the fiscal year increased to 428,000 in FY 2015, with a slightly higher percent change from 2014 to 2015 (3.3%) than observed from 2013 to 2014 (3.2%)." Since FY 2012, the number of children in foster care at the end of each FY has steadily increased.

The median amount of time a child spent in foster care in the U.S. in 2015 was 13.5 months. That year, 74% of children spent less than two years in foster care, while 13% were in care for three or more years. Of the estimated 427,910 children in foster care on September 30, 2015: 43 percent were White, 24 percent were African-American, 21 percent were Hispanic (of any race), 10 percent were other races or multiracial, and 2 percent were unknown or unable to be determined.

Children may enter foster care voluntarily or involuntarily. Voluntary placement may occur when a biological parent or lawful guardian is unable to care for a child. Involuntary placement occurs when a child is removed from their biological parent or lawful guardian due to the risk or actual occurrence of physical or psychological harm, or if the child has been orphaned. In the US, most children enter foster care due to neglect. If a biological parent or legal guardian is unwilling to care for a child, the child is deemed to be dependent and is placed under the care of the child protection agency. The policies regarding foster care as well as the criteria to be met in order to become a foster parent vary according to legal jurisdiction.

Especially egregious failures of child protective services often serve as a catalyst for increased removal of children from the homes of biological parents. An example is the brutal torture and murder of 17-month-old Peter Connelly, a British toddler who died in London Borough of Haringey, North London after suffering more than 50 severe injuries over an eight-month period, including eight broken ribs and a broken back. Throughout the period of time in which he was being tortured, he was repeatedly seen by Haringey Children's services and NHS health professionals. Haringey Children's services already failed ten years earlier in the case of Victoria Climbié. In the time since his death, in 2007, cases have reached a record rate in England surpassing 10,000 in the reporting year ending in March 2012.

Abuse and negligence 
From 1993 through 2002 there were 107 recorded deaths; there are approximately 400,000 children in out-of-home care, in the United States. Almost 10% of children in foster care have stayed in foster care for five or more years. Nearly half of all children in foster care have chronic medical problems. 8% of all children in foster care have serious emotional problems, 11% of children exiting foster care aged out of the system, in 2011. Children in foster care experience high rates of child abuse, emotional deprivation, and physical neglect. In one study in the United Kingdom "foster children were 7–8 times, and children in residential care 6 times more likely to be assessed by a pediatrician for abuse than a child in the general population". A study of foster children in Oregon and Washington State found that nearly one third reported being abused by a foster parent or another adult in a foster home. The "Parent Trauma Response Questionnaire" states that parental overprotection can be just as harmful psychologically as neglect.

Development 
As of 2019, the majority of children in the foster care system were under eight years of age. These early years are quite important for the physical and mental development of children. More specifically, these early years are most important for brain development. Stressful and traumatic experiences have been found to have long-term negative consequences for the brain development in children whereas talking, singing, and playing can help encourage brain growth. Since the majority of children are removed from their homes due to neglect, this means that many of these children did not experience stable and stimulating environments to help promote this necessary growth. In a research study conducted at the University of Minnesota, researchers found that children placed in non-parental homes, such as foster homes, showed significant behavior problems and higher levels of internalizing problems in comparison to children in traditional families and even children who were mistreated by caregivers. According to an article written by Elizabeth Curry titled "The five things you should know about how orphanage life affects children", a child who has lived in an orphanage or a home for multiple children will have learned survival skills but lack family skills due to them never understanding permanency.

Medical and psychiatric disorders 
A higher prevalence of physical, psychological, cognitive and epigenetic disorders for children in foster care has been established in studies in various countries. The Casey Family Programs Northwest Foster Care Alumni Study was a fairly extensive study of various aspects of children who had been in foster care.
Individuals who were in foster care experience higher rates of physical and psychiatric morbidity than the general population and suffer from not being able to trust and that can lead to placements breaking down.

In the Casey study of foster children in Oregon and Washington state, they were found to have double the incidence of depression, 20% as compared to 10% and were found to have a higher rate of post-traumatic stress disorder (PTSD) than combat veterans with 25% of those studied having PTSD. Children in foster care have a higher probability of having attention deficit hyperactivity disorder (ADHD), and deficits in executive functioning, anxiety as well as other developmental problems.

These children experience higher degrees of incarceration, poverty, homelessness, and suicide. Studies in the U.S. have suggested that some foster care placements may be more detrimental to children than remaining in a troubled home, but a more recent study suggested that these findings may have been affected by selection bias, and that foster care has little effect on behavioral problems.

Neurodevelopment 

Foster children have elevated levels of cortisol, a stress hormone, in comparison to children raised by their biological parents. Elevated cortisol levels can compromise the immune system. (Harden BJ, 2004). Most of the processes involved in typical neurodevelopment are predicated upon the establishment of close nurturing relationships and environmental stimulation. Negative environmental influences during this critical period of brain development can have lifelong consequences.

Post-traumatic stress disorder 

Children in foster care have a higher incidence of post-traumatic stress disorder (PTSD). In one study, 60% of children in foster care who had experienced sexual abuse had PTSD, and 42% of those who had been physically abused met the PTSD criteria. PTSD was also found in 18% of the children who were not abused. These children may have developed PTSD due to witnessing violence in the home. (Marsenich, 2002).

In order to figure out if a child is going through PTSD, there is a PTSD module, the 'anxiety disorder interview'. This is considered a reliable resource for establishing if a child is going through post traumatic stress disorder due to physical, sexual, or mental abuse.

In a study conducted in Oregon and Washington state, the rate of PTSD in adults who were in foster care for one year between the ages of 14–18 was found to be higher than that of combat veterans, with 25% of those in the study meeting the diagnostic criteria as compared to 12–13% of Iraq war veterans and 15% of Vietnam war veterans, and a rate of 4% in the general population. The recovery rate for foster home alumni was 28.2% as opposed to 47% in the general population.

"More than half the study participants reported clinical levels of mental illness, compared to less than a quarter of the general population".

Eating disorders 

Foster children are at increased risk for a variety of eating disorders in comparison to the general population. In a study done in the United Kingdom, 35% of foster children experienced an increase in Body Mass Index (BMI) once in care. Food Maintenance Syndrome is characterized by a set of aberrant eating behaviors of children in foster care. It is "a pattern of excessive eating and food acquisition and maintenance behaviors without concurrent obesity"; it resembles "the behavioral correlates of Hyperphagic Short Stature". It is hypothesized that this syndrome is triggered by the stress and maltreatment foster children are subjected to, it was prevalent amongst 25 percent of the study group in New Zealand. Bulimia nervosa is seven times more prevalent among former foster children than in the general population.

Poverty and homelessness 

Nearly half of foster children in the U.S. become homeless when they turn 18. One of every 10 foster children stays in foster care longer than seven years, and each year about 15,000 reach the age of majority and leave foster care without a permanent family—many to join the ranks of the homeless or to commit crimes and be imprisoned.

Three out of 10 of the United States homeless are former foster children. According to the results of the Casey Family Study of Foster Care Alumni, up to 80 percent are doing poorly—with a quarter to a third of former foster children at or below the poverty line, three times the national poverty rate. Very frequently, people who are homeless had multiple placements as children: some were in foster care, but others experienced "unofficial" placements in the homes of family or friends.

Individuals with a history of foster care tend to become homeless at an earlier age than those who were not in foster care. The length of time a person remains homeless is longer in individuals who were in foster care.

Suicide-death rate 

Children in foster care are at a greater risk of suicide. The increased risk of suicide is still prevalent after leaving foster care. In a small study of twenty-two Texan youths who aged out of the system, 23 percent had a history of suicide attempts.

A Swedish study utilizing the data of almost one million people including 22,305 former foster children who had been in care prior to their teens, concluded:

Death rate
Children in foster care have an overall higher mortality rate than children in the general population. A study conducted in Finland among current and former foster children up to age 24 found a higher mortality rate due to substance abuse, accidents, suicide and illness. The deaths due to illness were attributed to an increased incidence of acute and
chronic medical conditions and developmental delays among children in foster care.

Georgia Senator Nancy Schaefer published a report "The Corrupt Business of Child Protective Services" stating:

Academic prospects
Educational outcomes of ex-foster children in the Northwest Alumni Study:
 56% completed high school compared to 82% of the general population, although an additional 29% of former foster children received a G.E.D. compared to an additional 5% of the general population.
 42.7% completed some education beyond high school.
 20.6% completed any degree or certificate beyond high school
 16.1% completed a vocational degree; 21.9% for those over 25.
 1.8% complete a bachelor's degree, 2.7% for over 25, the completion rate for the general population in the same age group is 24%, a sizable difference.

The study reviewed case records for 659 foster care alumni in Northwest USA, and interviewed 479 of them
between September 2000 and January 2002.

Higher Education 
Approximately 10% of foster youth make it to college and of those 10%, only about 3% actually graduate and obtain a 4-year degree. Although the number of foster youth who are starting at a 4-year university after high school has increased over the years, the number of youth who graduate from college continues to remain stable. A study of 712 youth in California, the results revealed that foster care youth are fives times less likely to attend college than youth who do not go through foster care. There are different resources that offer both financial and emotional support for foster youth to continue their education. Simultaneously, there are also many barriers that make getting to a college or university difficult.

Borton describes some of the barriers youth face in her article, Barriers to Post-Secondary Enrollment for Former Foster Youth. A few of those barriers include financial hurdles, navigating through the application process with little to no support, and lack of housing.

Many studies have shown that there are a few factors that have seemingly played a role in the success of foster youth making it to and graduating from a college or university. While having financial resources for foster youth is a huge help, there are other components to look at. Beginning with having support for these youth at the high school level. In order for foster youth to obtain a college degree, they must enroll at a university first.

Out of the different factors that play in increasing college enrollment such as youth participating in extended foster care, reading ability, etc., youth who received assistance or had supportive relationships from adults, were more likely than youth who did not have supportive relationships, to enroll at a university.

At colleges across the nation, there are programs that are specifically put in place to help youth who have aged out of the foster care system and continued into higher education. These programs often help youth financially by giving them supplemental funds and providing support through peer mentor programs or academic counseling services. While funding is an important key in helping get through college, it has not been found as the only crucial component in aiding a youth's success.

A study done by Jay and colleagues provides insight on what youth view as important in helping them thrive on a college campus. The study, which had a sample of 51 foster youth, used Conceptual Mapping to break down the different components of support that may be important for youth to receive on a college campus. It is important to take in the different factors that can be helpful for youth at a university and to look beyond providing financial support.

Psychotropic medication use 

Studies have revealed that youth in foster care covered by Medicaid insurance receive psychotropic medication at a rate that was 3 times higher than that of Medicaid-insured youth who qualify by low family income. In a review (September 2003 to August 2004) of the medical records of 32,135 Texas foster care 0–19 years old, 12,189 were prescribed psychotropic medication, resulting in an annual prevalence of 37.9% of these children being prescribed medication. 41.3% received 3 different classes of these drugs during July 2004, and 15.9% received 4 different classes. The most frequently used medications were antidepressants (56.8%), attention-deficit/hyperactivity disorder drugs (55.9%), and antipsychotic agents (53.2%). The study also showed that youth in foster care are frequently treated with concomitant psychotropic medication, for which sufficient evidence regarding safety and effectiveness is not available.

The use of expensive, brand name, patent protected medication was prevalent. In the case of SSRIs the use of the most expensive medications was noted to be 74%; in the general market only 28% are for brand name SSRI's vs generics.  The average out-of-pocket expense per prescription was $34.75 for generics and $90.17 for branded products, a $55.42, difference.

Therapeutic intervention 

Children in the child welfare system have often experienced significant and repeated traumas and having a background in foster homes—especially in instances of sexual abuse—can be the precipitating factor in a wide variety of psychological and cognitive deficits it may also serve to obfuscate the true cause of underlying issues. The foster care experience may have nothing to do with the symptoms, or on the other hand, a disorder may be exacerbated by having a history of foster care and attendant abuses. The human brain however has been shown to have a fair degree of neuroplasticity. and adult neurogenesis has been shown to be an ongoing process.

Multidimensional Treatment Foster Care (MTFC), also referred to as Treatment Foster Care Oregon (TFCO) and Treatment Foster Care (TFC) is a community-based intervention that was created in 1983 by Dr. Patricia Chamberlain and her associated colleagues with the initial design intended to offer a replacement for group facilities. MTFC has differing approaches for different age groups. Preschoolers receive “a behavior-management approach and intensively trains, supervises, and supports foster caregivers to provide positive adult support and consistent limit setting” coupled with “coordinated interventions with the child’s biological parents.” MTFC for adolescence consists of individual placement with an intensely trained foster family providing “coordinated interventions in the home, with peers, [and] in educational settings.” MTFC has been shown to provide better results than group facilities and proves to be more cost effective. Reports show that Multidimensional treatment has effective results in reducing depression, arrest rates, deviant peer affiliations, placement disruption, and pregnancy rates while having positive replication trials. It is one method that attempts to incorporate trauma- and violence-informed care into its design.

Researchers have faced difficulty when it comes to accurately assessing what makes MTFC and other similar programs that involve multiple levels of intervention successful. It seems to remain in a "black box" scenario where it is unsure what aspect of the treatment plan is actually producing positive effects. Multiple peer-reviewed research articles on foster care programs point out a lack of research effectively evaluating the outcomes of specific foster care programs, calling for more complete assessments to be conducted in order to properly compare outcomes between treatment plans and evaluate what practices in MTFC are most effective. Ethical concerns have also been raised by Therese Åström and other associated researchers when conducting a systematic review on behalf of the Swedish Agency for Health Technology Assessment and Assessment of Social Services in 2018, noting that on the one hand MTFC is evaluated as effective, however, it tends to be implemented in a way that diminishes the child's agency.

Cross-cultural adoption policies 
George Shanti, Nico Van Oudenhoven, and Rekha Wazir, co-authors of Foster Care Beyond the Crossroads: Lessons from an International Comparative Analysis, say that there are four types of Government foster care systems. The first one is that of developing countries. These countries do not have policies implemented to take care of the basic needs of these children and these children mostly receive assistance from relatives. The second system is that of former socialist governments. The historical context of these states has not allowed for the evolution of their foster care system. NGO's have urged them to evolve; however the traditional system of institutionalizing these children is still in place. Thirdly, liberal democracies do not have the support from its political system in order to take care of these children, even though they have the resources. Finally, social democracies are the most advanced governments in regards to their foster care system. These governments have a massive infrastructure, funding, and support system in order to help foster care children.

Adoption 

Foster care adoption is a type of domestic adoption where the child is initially placed into a foster care system and is subsequently placed for adoption.

Children may be placed into foster care for a variety of reasons; including, removal from the home by a governmental agency because of maltreatment. In some jurisdictions, adoptive parents are licensed as and technically considered foster parents while the adoption is being finalized. According to the U.S Department of Health and Human Services Children's Bureau, there were approximately 408,425 children in foster care in 2010. Of those children, twenty-five percent had a goal of adoption. In 2015, 243,060 children exited foster care and twenty-two percent were adopted. Nationwide, there are more than one hundred thousand children in the U.S. foster care system waiting for permanent families.

Outcomes 
Youth who are aging out of foster care often face difficulties in transitioning into adulthood, especially in terms of finding stable housing, employment, finances, and educational opportunities. The suspected reason for these difficulties involves a lack of stability experienced while in the foster care system, and the reported abuse and/or neglect in their childhood, which may affect their ability to cope with significant life changes. In the United States, there are independent living programs designed with the intent to serve the needs of transitioning foster youth. However, youth aging out of foster care have indicated that these programs are failing to fully address the needs of young adults without familial assistance.

In a study conducted by Gypen et al. (2017), involving a cross-database analysis of research articles relevant to the outcomes of former foster youth, they found that the educational, mental health, employment, income, stable housing, criminal involvement and substance abuse issues outcomes for youth who have aged out of the foster care system are substantially poorer than their peers. For example, Gypen et al. (2017), indicated that only 45% of former foster youth received a high school diploma, which is 23% lower than the general population. There are also significantly poorer outcomes for children who were formerly in foster care than children from low-income households. Children who are eventually adopted by their placement family show greater outcomes, in terms of finding stable housing, employment, finances and education opportunities, than those who aged out of the foster care system without a permanent placement.

It has also been reported that former foster youth have a higher chance of ending up in prostitution, and even fall prey to sex trafficking. This has also been called the "foster care to prostitution pipeline". a 2012 study in Los Angeles found that 59% of juveniles arrested for prostitution were or had been in foster care, but the generalizability of these findings has been disputed.

See also 

 Assisted living
 Attachment theory
 Child abandonment
 Child and family services
 Child and youth care
 Community-based care
 Community integration
 Complex post-traumatic stress disorder
 Congregate Care
 Cottage Homes
 Independent living
 Orphan train
 Orphanage
 Reactive attachment disorder
 Residential education
 Substance dependence
 Supported living
 Supported housing
 Teaching-family model
 Family support
Wraparound (childcare)

References

Further reading 

 Bald, Anthony, Joseph J. Doyle Jr., Max Gross, and Brian A. Jacob. 2022. "Economics of Foster Care." Journal of Economic Perspectives, 36 (2): 223–46.
 Hurley, Kendra (2002). "Almost Home" Retrieved June 27, 2006.
 
 Knowlton, Paul E. (2001). "The Original Foster Care Survival Guide"; A first person account directed to successfully aging out of foster care.
 McCutcheon, James, 2010. "Historical Analysis and Contemporary Assessment of Foster Care in Texas: Perceptions of Social Workers in a Private, Non-Profit Foster Care Agency". Applied Research Projects. Texas State University Paper 332.

External links 
 The Mental Health of Children in Out-of-Home Care: Scale and Complexity of Mental Health Problems
 Effects of Enhanced Foster Care on the Long-term Physical and Mental Health of Foster Care Alumni
 The impact of foster care on development
 Enduring neurobehavioral effects of early life trauma mediated through learning and corticosterone suppression 
 

 
Adoption forms and related practices
Adoption, fostering, orphan care and displacement
Family